Budakovo is a village in the municipality of Mogila, North Macedonia. It used to be part of the former municipality of Dobruševo.

Demographics
According to the 2002 census, the village had a total of 248 inhabitants. Ethnic groups in the village include:

Turks 200
Macedonians 44
Albanians 3
Others 1

References

External links

Villages in Mogila Municipality
Turkish communities in North Macedonia